Antheia was a figure in Greek mythology.

Antheia or Anthea (ancient Greek: Ἄνθεια) may also refer to:
Anthea, a given name
Antheia (Achaea), a town of ancient Achaea, Greece
Antheia (Argolis), a town of ancient Argolis, Greece
Antheia (Messenia), a town of ancient Messenia, Greece
Antheia (Thessaly), a town of ancient Thessaly, Greece
Antheia (Thrace), a town of ancient Thrace, now in Bulgaria
Antheia, Evros, a town in Greece
Antheia, Patras, a neighbourhood of Patras, Greece
Antheia, ancient name of Sozopol, Bulgaria
Antheia, the name of one of the Hesperides